Laval Castle is a château-ferme, or fortified farmhouse, in the hamlet of Laval in Tillet in the municipality of Sainte-Ode, province of Luxembourg,  Wallonia, Belgium.

The present building is a house of the 17th century, the oldest surviving part of which is a cellar of the 14th century, from a previous structure. The château-ferme is open to the public, and its outbuildings are available for overnight accommodation.

See also
List of castles in Belgium
 De Verstraetekes zijn hier op weekend geweest in de herfst van 2005

Castles in the Ardennes (Belgium)
Castles in Belgium
Castles in Luxembourg (Belgium)
Sainte-Ode